Mendim (Mändem) is a rural locality (a village) in Tashlinsky Selsoviet, Gafuriysky District, Bashkortostan, Russia. The population was 204 as of 2010. There are 4 streets.

Geography 
Mendim is located 26 km east of Krasnousolsky (the district's administrative centre) by road. Tashla is the nearest rural locality.

References 

Rural localities in Gafuriysky District